The Palestine Festival of Literature (PalFest) is an annual literary festival, founded in 2008, that takes place in cities across Palestine.

History 

The festival was founded in 2008 with the stated mission of affirming "the power of culture over the culture of power" and breaking what it considers a cultural siege against Palestine. The festival's founding chair is the novelist and political commentator Ahdaf Soueif. Mahmoud Darwish sent a message to the inaugural festival in which he wrote: “Thank you dear friends for your noble solidarity, thank you for your courageous gesture to break the moral siege inflicted upon us and thank you because you are resisting the invitation to dance on our graves. We are here. We are still alive.”

In an effort to overcome restrictions on Palestinians' freedom of movement, the festival travels to its audiences putting on free events in Arabic and English in the cities it travels to. The festival traditionally performs in Jerusalem, Ramallah, Haifa and Nablus. Because travel to Gaza is so restricted, far fewer events take place there. In 2012 the festival happened exclusively in Gaza, as it was able to pressure access through Rafah, Egypt. Visiting author China Miéville said the festival is "not only the most powerful and important literary festival it's ever been my privilege to attend, it's one of the most powerful and important things I've experienced, full stop".

Dozens of authors who attended the festival have gone on to write about their experiences in Palestine. In 2017, Bloomsbury Books published This Is Not a Border: Reportage & Reflection from the Palestine Festival of Literature – a collection of works from 47 authors who had participated in the festival. The New Statesman wrote of it: "This anthology will help turn your intellectual understanding of oppression into an emotional one."

After ten editions, the organisers announced took a break in 2018 to assess the role of the festival in a rapidly changing world. In 2019, the festival was re-launched with "a sharpened focus on how to foster new writing that clarifies and frames the connections between the colonization of Palestine and the accelerating systems of control and dispossession around the world." In 2020 and 2021, the festival was canceled again, this time because of the COVID-19 pandemic.

Patrons and participants  
Patrons of the festival have included Chinua Achebe, John Berger, Mahmoud Darwish, Seamus Heaney, Harold Pinter, Sir Philip Pullman and Dame Emma Thompson. Pullman said of the festival: "Every literary act, whether it is a great epic poem or an honest piece of journalism or a simple nonsense tale for children is a blow against the forces of stupidity and ignorance and darkness … The Palestine Festival of Literature exists to do just that – and I salute it for its work. Not only this year but for as long as it is necessary."

More than 220 international and Palestinian artists have been participants, including Michael Ondaatje, Alice Walker, Raja Shehadeh, J. M. Coetzee, Suad Amiry, Henning Mankell, Taha Muhammad Ali, Geoff Dyer, Suheir Hammad, Claire Messud, Pankaj Mishra, Gary Younge, Richard Ford, Sir  Michael Palin, and many others.

Restrictions and closures  
2009: Both the opening and closing nights attempts were made by the Israeli police, acting on court order, to prevent the festival from taking place, since the Palestinian Authority was involved. Both times the festival relocated: to the French Cultural Institute on the first night and to the British Council on the last.
2011: Venue for the festival's closing event in Silwan was tear gassed.
2012: Closing event of the inaugural PalFest Gaza was shut down by the police. Attempts in 2009 and 2010 to hold PalFest Gaza were impeded when organizers were denied entry permits, in the latter case by the regime of former Egyptian president Hosni Mubarak.
2015: Festival participant Sara Ishaq, Oscar-nominated film director, was prevented from entering the country by Israeli border police.
2015: Festival participant Ahmed Masoud was prevented from entering the country by Israeli border police.

Awards  
 2010: Ahdaf Soueif Awarded Inaugural Mahmoud Darwish Award
 2017: Hay Festival Award for Festivals
 2019: Ahdaf Soueif Awarded European Cultural Foundation Culture Award

References

Literary festivals in the State of Palestine
Palestinian literature
Literary festivals in Israel
Festivals in the State of Palestine